Bart syndrome, also known as aplasia cutis congenita type VI, is a rare genetic disorder characterized by the association of congenital localized absence of skin, mucocutaneous blistering and absent and dystrophic nails.

History
This clinical trial was first described by Bruce J Bart in 1966, who reported a large family with 26 affected members.

Clinical
1. Absence of skin at birth, involving the lower legs and feet, healing within a few months, leaving scarring and fragile skin.
2. Widespread blistering of the skin and mucous membranes.
3. Variable absence and dystrophy of nails.

Genetics
The syndrome is inherited by autosomal dominant transmission with complete penetrance but variable expression. This means that children of an affected parent that carries the gene have a 50% chance of developing the disorder, although the extent to which they are affected is variable.

Blistering in Bart syndrome represents a form of epidermolysis bullosa caused by ultrastructural abnormalities in the anchoring fibrils. Genetic linkage of the inheritance of the disease points to the region of chromosome 3 near the collagen, type VII, alpha 1 gene (COL7A1).

See also 
 List of cutaneous conditions
 Bart-Pumphrey syndrome

References

External links 

Genodermatoses
Collagen disease
Syndromes affecting the skin